The following list enumerates a selection of Marian, Josephian, and Christological images venerated in the Roman Catholic Church, authorised by a Pope who has officially granted a papal bull of Pontifical coronation to be carried out either by the Pontiff, his papal legate or a papal nuncio.
The prescription of the solemn rite to crown venerated images is embedded in the  published by the Holy Office on 25 May 1981. 

Prior to 1989, pontifical decrees concerning the authorization of canonical coronations were handwritten on parchment. After 1989, the Congregation for Divine Worship and the Discipline of the Sacraments began issuing the specific recognition to crown a religious image, spelling out its approved devotional title and authorizing papal legate. Several venerated images of Jesus Christ and Saint Joseph have also been granted a pontifical coronation.


Pontifically crowned Marian images

Algeria

Andorra

Argentina

Austria

Belarus

Belgium

Bolivia

Brazil

Canada

Chile

Colombia

Costa Rica

Croatia

Cuba

Czech Republic

Dominican Republic

Ecuador

El Salvador

France

Germany

Guatamala

India

Italy

Japan

Kuwait

Lithuania

Malta

Mexico

The Netherlands

Nicaragua

Panama

Paraguay

Peru

The Philippines

Poland

Portugal

Slovenia

Spain

Sri Lanka

Switzerland

Taiwan

Ukraine

United Kingdom

United States of America

Uruguay

Venezuela

Pontifically crowned Christological images
The list below enumerates approved Christological images with a written and expressed pontifical recognition and were granted a canonical coronation.

Pontifically crowned Josephian images 
The list below enumerates approved Patriarchal images of Saint Joseph with a written and expressed pontifical recognition and were granted a decree of canonical coronation.

References

Notes

Catholic Church-related lists
Arts-related lists
Virgin Mary in art
Saint Joseph in art